Paul Stanley is the first solo studio album from American musician Paul Stanley, the singer-songwriter is best known for serving as the rhythm guitarist and lead vocalist of hard rock band Kiss. It was one of four solo albums released by the members of Kiss on September 18, 1978, coming out alongside Peter Criss, Ace Frehley, and Gene Simmons. It is the only release out of the four Kiss solo albums to feature all original songs, as Simmons, Criss and Frehley each recorded one cover song on their albums.

Reception

The album reached No. 40 on the US Billboard album chart. AllMusic gave the album 3 stars out of 5 and said that it is the most "Kiss-like" out of all the Kiss solo albums.

Track listing
All credits adapted from the original release.
All songs written by Paul Stanley, except tracks 2, 3 and 5, co-written by Mikel Japp.

Personnel
Paul Stanley – lead and backing vocals, rhythm guitar, lead guitar, acoustic guitar, EBow, all guitars on track 7, producer, mixing

Additional personnel
Bob Kulick – lead guitar, acoustic guitar
Steve Buslowe – bass guitar on tracks 1–5
Eric Nelson – bass guitar on tracks 6–9
Richie Fontana – drums on tracks 1–4
Carmine Appice – drums on track 5
Craig Krampf – drums on tracks 6–9
Diana Grasselli – backing vocals on track 2
Miriam Naomi Valle – backing vocals on track 2
Maria Vidal – backing vocals on track 2
Peppy Castro – backing vocals on tracks 3 and 7
Doug Katsaros – piano, Omni string ensemble and backing vocals on track 7
Steve Lacey – electric guitar on track 8

Production
Jeff Glixman – engineer, producer (tracks 5, 6, 8, 9)
Paul Grupp – engineer
Barbara Isaak – assistant engineer
Mike D. Stone – mixing at the Record Plant, New York City
Karat Faye – OD engineer
George Marino – remastering
Eraldo Carugati – album artwork

Charts

Certification

References

External links
 
 KISSONLINE.COM Discography – Paul Stanley, accessed on March 30, 2016

1978 debut albums
Albums produced by Jeff Glixman
Albums produced by Paul Stanley
Albums recorded at Electric Lady Studios
Casablanca Records albums
Paul Stanley albums